Ortilia liriope, the Brazilian crescent, is a butterfly of the family Nymphalidae. It was described by Pieter Cramer in 1775. It is found in French Guiana, Guyana, Suriname and northern Brazil.

The larvae are gregarious and feed on Justicia species. Full-grown larvae have a dark brown body and reddish-brown head. They reach a length of about 19 mm.

References

Butterflies described in 1775
Melitaeini
Fauna of Brazil
Nymphalidae of South America
Taxa named by Pieter Cramer